Lutibacter maritimus is a Gram-negative, aerobic and non-motile bacterium from the genus of Lutibacter which has been isolated from tidal flat sediments from Saemankum in Korea.

References

External links
microbewiki

Flavobacteria
Bacteria described in 2010